George Shearing and the Montgomery Brothers is an album by Anglo-American jazz pianist George Shearing and jazz trio  The Montgomery Brothers, released in 1961.

Reception

In his Allmusic review, music critic Scott Yanow called the album an "enjoyable if slightly lightweight outing." with "some fine soloing by the principals."

Track listing 

 "Love Walked In"  (George Gershwin, Ira Gershwin) – 2:10
 "Love for Sale" (Cole Porter) – 3:32
 "No Hard Feelings" (Buddy Montgomery) – 3:45
 "Enchanted" (George Shearing) – 3:41
 "Stranger in Paradise" (Alexander Borodin, Robert Wright, George Forrest) – 4:47
 "The Lamp Is Low" (Maurice Ravel, Peter de Rose, Mitchell Parish, Bert Shefter) – 2:11
 "Double Deal" (Wes Montgomery) – 3:47
 "And Then I Wrote" (Shearing) – 3:15
 "Darn That Dream" (Eddie DeLange, Jimmy Van Heusen) - 4:18
 "Lois Ann" (Buddy Montgomery) – 3:08
 "Mambo in Chimes" (Armando Peraza) – 2:26

CD Reissue
 "Love Walked In"  – 2:12
 "Love Walked In" [Take 1] – 3:41
 "Love for Sale" – 3:31
 "No Hard Feelings" – 3:49
 "Enchanted" – 3:38
 "Stranger in Paradise" – 4:52
 "The Lamp Is Low" – 2:15
 "Double Deal" – 3:48
 "And Then I Wrote" – 3:19
 "Darn That Dream" - 4:21
 "Darn That Dream" [Take 1] – 4:14
 "Lois Ann" – 3:12
 "Mambo in Chimes" – 2:30
 "Mambo in Chimes" [Take 1] – 4:07

Personnel
 George Shearing – piano
 Buddy Montgomery – vibraphone
 Wes Montgomery – guitar
 Monk Montgomery – bass
 Walter Perkins – drums (1-5, 7-10)
 Armando Peraza – bongos, conga (5, 6, 11)
 Ricardo Chimelis – bongos, conga, timbales (5, 6, 11)

Production notes:
 Orrin Keepnews – producer, liner notes
 Wally Heider – engineer
 Joe Tarantino – mastering
 William Claxton – photography
 Ken Deardoff – design

References

1961 albums
George Shearing albums
Montgomery Brothers albums
Albums produced by Orrin Keepnews